Los Hermanos is the debut studio album by the rock band Los Hermanos. It was released in 1999 on Abril Music.

Track listing

Personnel 
Marcelo Camelo – Vocals, guitar
Rodrigo Amarante – Vocals, transverse flute
Patrick Laplan – Bass guitar
Rodrigo Barba – Drums
Bruno Medina – Keyboards
Rafael Ramos – Producer

Additional musicians 
Mário Lúcio Gomes – Tenor Saxophone
Sidnei Borgani – Trombone
Nahor Gomes – Trumpet

Special guests 
Roger Rocha Moreira ("Bárbara")
Carlos Jazzma ("Pierrot")

Certifications

References

Los Hermanos albums
1999 albums
Albums produced by Rick Bonadio